Oljoro is an administrative ward in the Arusha Rural District of the Arusha Region of Tanzania. The ward is home to Mungu Crater  which is 1,030 meters deep. According to the 2002 census, the ward has a total population of 7,896

References

Wards of Arusha District
Wards of Arusha Region